Mitsubishi Motors concepts are those prototype and concept cars exhibited around the world by Mitsubishi Motors. In common with other automakers, Mitsubishi has used concept cars as both show cars—stylistically adventurous motor show exhibits with no production intentions behind them—or as precursors of future models destined for mass production.

The first Mitsubishi concept car was a two-seat convertible version of the Colt 600, which was introduced at the 9th Tokyo Motor Show in 1962 by Shin Mitsubishi Heavy-Industries, one of the companies which would combine to form Mitsubishi Motors in 1970. Although the company had no intention of marketing it, the convertible helped attract the public's attention to the more mundane sedan.

Latterly, Mitsubishi has exploited its heritage in its motor show exhibits, using vehicles from its past displayed in parallel with new model introductions. The Colt 600 convertible was brought out from the Mitsubishi Museum in 2005, alongside the new cabriolet version of the Mitsubishi Colt which debuted at the 75th Geneva Motor Show. The following year they revisited the theme by promoting the newest version of their Mitsubishi Pajero sport utility vehicle alongside a 1934 Mitsubishi PX33, a pre-World War II military prototype which was the first Japanese sedan equipped with four-wheel drive. They took the same approach a third time in 2007, with the tenth iteration of the rallying-derived Mitsubishi Lancer Evolution. It was exhibited at the North American International Auto Show in 2007 alongside the Mitsubishi Lancer 1600 GSR, which gained renown after winning the Safari Rally in 1974.

List of Mitsubishi concepts and prototypes

Notes